Renodesta is a genus of silken fungus beetles in the family Cryptophagidae. There are at least two described species in Renodesta.

Species
These two species belong to the genus Renodesta:
 Renodesta ramsdalei Caterino, Leschen & Johnson, 2008
 Renodesta stephani Caterino, Leschen & Johnson, 2008

References

Further reading

 
 
 
 

Cryptophagidae
Articles created by Qbugbot